The 2010–11 season was Sheffield United's third consecutive season in the Football League Championship after coming 8th in the 2009–10 season. It was Kevin Blackwell's third season in charge of United; however, he left Bramall Lane in mid-August after losing at home to QPR. Gary Speed was named as his successor but lasted only until December when he left to take over the Wales national side.  Following a short spell as caretaker by John Carver, Micky Adams was appointed manager for the rest of the season. It was a turbulent season off the pitch and results declined, with Adams being unable to save the team from relegation to League One for the first time in 23 years.

Players

First-team squad

Left club during season

Statistics

Goals and appearances

|-
|colspan="14"|Players who left before the end of the season:

|}

Transfers

In

Loans in

Out

Loans out

Results

Championship

FA Cup

League Cup

References

Notes

Sheffield United F.C. seasons
Sheffield United